Ewhrudjakpo Lawrence Oborawharievwo (born 5 September 1965) is a Nigerian politician who serves as the Deputy Governor of Bayelsa State. He was the senator representing Bayelsa west senatorial district of Bayelsa State at the 9th National Assembly.

Early life and education
Lawrence Ewhrudjakpo was born on 5 September 1965, into the family of chief and Mrs. Awhowho Ewhrudjakpo in Ofoni at Sagbama Bayelsa state. He attended the Ebikimiye Primary School, Kpakiama where he graduated in 1976, he continued his education at Government College Bomadi in 1982 and later completed his secondary education at Community Secondary School, Ofoni where he obtained his West African School Certificate (WASC) in 1987. He obtained a diploma in community health at Rivers State College of Health Science and Technology, Port Harcourt, Rivers State, between 1989 and 1991.  He also attended the Rivers State University of Science and Technology, Port Harcourt between 1991 and 1996 where he obtained a Bachelor of Science (B. Sc.) in secretarial administration. In 1998, He obtained his Master's in Business Administration and also obtained an MBA, Management Option in 2000 at Rivers State University of Science and Technology. He later studied law between 2002 -2007 at the Rivers State University of Science and Technology and was called to bar in 2009.

Political career
On October 4, 2018, He was announced the winner of the PDP Bayelsa West primary election. In the February 23, 2019, Bayelsa West senatorial district, Ewhrudjakpo was announced winner having defeated Mathew Karimo of the APC  having polled  49,912 votes as Karimo polled 20,219 votes
Ewhurdjakpo was picked as the running mate to Diri Duoye in the Bayelsa state governorship election. In the November 16, 2019, Bayelsa Governorship Election, the candidate of the APC, David Lyon was declared winner having polled 352,552 votes to defeat Diri Duoye, who polled 143,172 votes.

On Thursday, February 13, 2020, the supreme court in Abuja ordered the Independent National Electoral Commission to withdraw the Certificate of Return issued to the All Progressives Congress candidate David Lyon as his running mate Degi Eremienyo Wangagra was found guilty of presenting false certificates. The court also asked Inec to issue a new certificate of return to the candidate of the party with the next highest votes and with the required constitutional spread of votes. The candidates are Douye Diri and Lawrence Ewhrudjakpo.

On February 21, 2020, An Area Court in Lugbe Abuja ordered the Department of State Services (DSS) to investigate the allegation of forgery of a National Youth Service Corp (NYSC) certificate levelled against Lawrence Ewhrudjakpo.

References

1965 births
Living people
21st-century Nigerian lawyers
Peoples Democratic Party (Nigeria) politicians
Rivers State University alumni